Pittway Corporation was a diversified holding company best known as a manufacturer and distributor of professional and consumer fire and burglar alarms.

In 1962, Neison Harris became president, after having worked as an executive at Gillette, at a time when the company was transitioning from a trolley operating company to a diversified concern running multiple businesses. The demise of the trolley operations could likely be attributed to the rise in personal car purchases.

Neison Harris' brother, Irving B. Harris, also played a significant part in the company. Leo Guthart was previously the company's vice-chairman.

Among the company's acquisitions in the 1960s were Barr-Stalfort Co., an aerosol cans filler company, Alarm Device Manufacturing Co., and Industrial Publishing Co.

It relocated its headquarters to Chicago in 1967. In 1967, the company was renamed to Pittway Corporation. Later, Pittway became best known as a manufacturer and distributor of the First Alert brand of home smoke alarms, professional fire and burglar alarms, and other security systems, and as a real estate firm.  It also owned the fire alarm companies Fire-Lite and Notifier.

, the company's vice-chairman was C. D. Palmer, who was also the senior executive based in the company's former home town of Pittsburgh.

In the 1970s, Pittway and General Electric were the dominant consumer smoke alarm manufacturers. At that time, Pittway units were distributed by Sears. In 1978, the Consumer Product Safety Commission assessed a  fine against Pittway for selling smoke detectors which were themselves fire hazards.

Notes

References

Companies based in Chicago
Companies based in Pittsburgh
Manufacturing companies disestablished in 2000
Holding companies disestablished in 2000
Holding companies established in 1967
1967 establishments in Pennsylvania
2000 disestablishments in Illinois
2000 mergers and acquisitions
Manufacturing companies established in 1967